Dexter's Laboratory is an American animated television series created by Genndy Tartakovsky for Cartoon Network. Initially debuting on February 26, 1995 as a seven-minute World Premiere Toons pilot, it was expanded into a full series after gaining network approval. The first season, which consists of 13 episodes divided into three segments each, premiered on TNT on April 27, 1996, and on TBS and Cartoon Network the following day. A second season that consists of 39 episodes premiered in 1997. In this season, Allison Moore, the voice actor for Dee Dee during the first season, was replaced by Kat Cressida, save for a few episodes. "Last But Not Beast", the second-season finale, was originally supposed to conclude the series in 1998. However, Tartakovsky directed a television movie titled Dexter's Laboratory: Ego Trip which aired on Cartoon Network on December 10, 1999. He left the series after the movie, focusing on his other projects, Samurai Jack and Star Wars: Clone Wars.

Production on a third season began in 2000 with Chris Savino taking over as creative director and later producer. The third season premiered worldwide on November 18, 2001, during Cartoon Network's "Dexter Goes Global" marathon. The third-season episode "Poppa Wheely/A Mom Cartoon/The Mock Side of the Moon" is the first to feature Christine Cavanaugh's replacement Candi Milo as the voice of Dexter. Milo would voice the character from the next episode onward, with the exception of "Tele Trauma". A fourth and final season consisting of 13 episodes aired from November 22, 2002, to November 20, 2003. In total, there are 78 episodes and a television movie across 4 seasons.

A previously unaired episode called "Rude Removal" was originally shown only at certain comic conventions that Tartakovsky attended beginning in 1998. The segment, originally produced for season two, was released online by Adult Swim on January 22, 2013.

Series overview

Episodes

Pilots (1995–96)

Season 1 (1996–97)

Season 2 (1997–98)

"Rude Removal"
An episode segment from the second season was produced yet never aired on television, but was ultimately released to the public in January 2013 on the official YouTube page of Adult Swim.

TV movie (1999)
A television movie titled Dexter's Laboratory: Ego Trip premiered on Cartoon Network in 1999. It was the final televised Dexter's Laboratory media in which creator Genndy Tartakovsky was directly involved. Ego Trip was also the last project made by Cartoon Network Studios under ownership of Hanna-Barbera before the studio branched off as a separate facility when Hanna-Barbera was folded into Warner Bros. Animation.

Season 3 (2001–02)
Candi Milo replaced Christine Cavanaugh as the voice of Dexter after the first 6 episodes due to Cavanaugh's retirement from voice acting. This is the first season to feature the new character designs and the UPA-influenced backgrounds. It is also the first season to use digital ink and paint. It is also the first season that Chris Savino takes over as the director.

Season 4 (2002–03)

Notes

References

External links
 
 

Dexter's Laboratory
Dexter's Laboratory
Lists of Cartoon Network television series episodes